Fulton is the largest city in and the county seat of Callaway County, Missouri, United States. The population was 12,790 in the 2010 census. The city is home to two universities, Westminster College and William Woods University; the Missouri School for the Deaf; the Fulton State Hospital; and the Fulton Reception and Diagnostic Center state prison. Missouri's only nuclear power plant, the Callaway Plant is located 13 miles southeast of Fulton.

History
The first settlement in the county was in 1809 at Cote Sans Dessein along the Missouri River. Early leaders considered siting the first Missouri state capital in the territory between Wainwright and Tebbetts. Callaway County was organized in 1820 and was named after Captain James Callaway, who was killed by Native Americans. Elizabeth became the first county seat. Many of the villages and towns in the county today represent places where railroad stations existed in early years.

In 1861, word arrived that Union troops had advanced to a nearby county. Colonel Jefferson F. Jones, from eastern Callaway County, assembled troops to protect the county. Forces were limited as many were already defending the country, but Jones marched the troops eastward to meet the approaching companies.

The successful defense was merely an illusion. Tree logs, erected by the troops, resembled artillery in the shadows of campfires and deterred Union troops. Talks continued several days and secured a mutual ceasefire agreement between the United States of America and Callaway County. Elated from the successful defense, citizens proclaimed their county The Kingdom of Callaway, a reference that remains today.

Fulton, the largest city in Callaway County, was founded and became the county seat in 1825 but was not incorporated until March 14, 1859. The city was originally named Volney after Constantin François de Chassebœuf, comte de Volney, but was changed to honor Robert Fulton, the engineer and inventor, two months after the initial Volney name in 1825. Volney, New York is a town in Oswego County, New York which is also named for Volney.  A village within the town of Volney is Fulton, New York which is also named for Robert Fulton.

The early residents of Fulton were from predominantly southern culture. The coastal and upland southerners that settled the land brought with them slaves and established an agricultural economy.

When the first history of Callaway County was compiled in 1884, the die had already been cast as far as the type of community Fulton was to be. The Missouri General Assembly had voted to establish an asylum for the insane in Fulton (February 26, 1847), the first mental health facility west of the Mississippi; the General Assembly agreed (February 28, 1851) to establish a school for the education of the deaf in Fulton; in 1842 the Presbyterian Church had opened a female seminary later known as Synodical College; in the fall of 1851 the Presbyterian Church established the all-male Fulton College, now known as Westminster College; and Fulton was the seat of county government. Winston Churchill gave his famous "Sinews of Peace" (Iron Curtain) speech at Westminster on March 5, 1946, in the presence of President Harry S Truman.

The Christian Church moved its Orphan School to Fulton in 1890. The school, which had previously been located at Camden Point, Missouri, later became William Woods College for Women, which later became a coed university.

Novelist Henry Bellamann was born in Fulton in 1882, and grew up and attended college there. Fulton is said to have been Bellamann's model for the fictional town of the novel Kings Row, which generated questions about the resemblance it had to individuals and situations around the area. In 1940, producers made a movie based on the book. The cast included Ann Sheridan, Robert Cummings, Ronald Reagan and Betty Field. The suit worn by Ronald Reagan in the film is on display at the Show Me Innovation Center offices of the Callaway Chamber of Commerce.

The M. Fred Bell Rental Cottage, M. Fred Bell Speculative Cottage, Brandon-Bell-Collier House, George Washington Carver School, Court Street Historic Residential District, Downtown Fulton Historic District, John Augustus Hockaday House, Pitcher Store, Robnett-Payne House, Westminster College Gymnasium, Westminster College Historic District, and White Cloud Presbyterian Church and Cemetery are listed on the National Register of Historic Places.

Geography

Demographics

2010 census
As of the census of 2010, there were 12,790 people, 4,085 households, and 2,255 families living in the city. The racial makeup of the city was 83.4% White, 12.0% African American, 0.5% Native American, 1.2% Asian, 0.6% from other races, and 2.3% from two or more races. Hispanic or Latino of any race were 2.1% of the population.

There were 4,085 households, of which 28.5% had children under the age of 18 living with them, 36.3% were married couples living together, 14.2% had a female householder with no husband present, 4.7% had a male householder with no wife present, and 44.8% were non-families. 37.4% of all households were made up of individuals, and 14.2% had someone living alone who was 65 years of age or older. The average household size was 2.23 and the average family size was 2.93.

The median age in the city was 31.3 years. 17.4% of residents were under the age of 18; 21.6% were between the ages of 18 and 24; 27.4% were from 25 to 44; 21.2% were from 45 to 64; and 12.4% were 65 years of age or older. The gender makeup of the city was 54.8% male and 45.2% female.

2000 census
As of the census of 2000, there were 12,128 people, 3,700 households, and 2,208 families living in the city. The population density was 1,072.3 people per square mile (414.0/km2). There were 4,131 housing units at an average density of 365.2 per square mile (141.0/km2). The racial makeup of the city was 81.26% White, 15.44% African American, 0.41% Native American, 1.06% Asian, 0.02% Pacific Islander, 0.38% from other races, and 1.43% from two or more races. Hispanic or Latino of any race were 1.09% of the population.

There were 3,700 households, out of which 28.9% had children under the age of 18 living with them, 40.9% were married couples living together, 14.8% had a female householder with no husband present, and 40.3% were non-families. 33.5% of all households were made up of individuals, and 14.9% had someone living alone who was 65 years of age or older. The average household size was 2.28 and the average family size was 2.90.

In the city, the population was spread out, with 18.0% under the age of 18, 20.0% from 18 to 24, 31.1% from 25 to 44, 16.9% from 45 to 64, and 14.0% who were 65 years of age or older. The median age was 33 years. For every 100 females, there were 129.8 males. For every 100 females age 18 and over, there were 134.8 males.

The median income for a household in the city was $32,635, and the median income for a family was $41,722. Males had a median income of $27,418 versus $21,663 for females. The per capita income for the city was $14,489. About 8.4% of families and 11.9% of the population were below the poverty line, including 16.1% of those under age 18 and 6.3% of those age 65 or over.

Government and infrastructure

Rosa Parks Center, a Missouri Division of Youth Services (DYS) center for incarcerated girls, is a former university dormitory, located at William Woods University (WWU). It holds 10-12 girls at a time. WWU students are involved with the center. DYS and WWU agreed to the joint project in 2000, and the center opened in January 2001. Fulton also has a municipal airport, the Elton Hensley Memorial Airport.

Education

Post-secondary
Westminster College and William Woods University are the two post-secondary institutions in the city. Fulton was formerly, from 1842 until its closing in 1928, the site of Synodical College, one of the earliest women's colleges in the United States.

Primary and secondary schools
Bartley Elementary (K–5), Bush Elementary (K–5), McIntire Elementary (K–5), Fulton Middle School (6–8) and Fulton High School (9–12) are part of the Fulton 58 School District.

St Peters Catholic School (K–8), and Kingdom Christian Academy (K–11) are both private schools.

Missouri School for the Deaf, a state school supervised under The Missouri Department of Secondary and Elementary Education (DESE), is also located in Fulton.

Public library
Fulton has a public library, a branch of the Daniel Boone Regional Library.

Museums
The National Churchill Museum in Fulton commemorates the statesman and his Iron Curtain speech. The 1946 address built a legacy bringing to Westminster College world leaders: Lech Wałęsa, Margaret Thatcher, Harry S. Truman, Gerald R. Ford, Ronald W. Reagan, George H. W. Bush, Mikhail Gorbachev and NATO representatives.

With the removal of the Berlin Wall, Churchill's granddaughter acquired a section of it to create a sculpture, entitled "Break Through", to commemorate the Iron Curtain speech. Visitors view it on the quadrangle at Westminster College. The Memorial includes the Church of St Mary the Virgin, Aldermanbury. Craftsmen dismantled the structure in London, England and rebuilt it on the Westminster campus to mark Churchill's visit.

Museums and displays depict beginnings in the Kingdom of Callaway. The Fishback Museum spotlights history of the Missouri School for the Deaf. The Kingdom Expo and Antique Car Museum emphasizes transitions in transportation. Photos, genealogy research and history books headline the exhibit at the Historical Society. In addition, the Kingdom of Callaway Chamber of Commerce and Visitor Center features a display of "King's Row" memorabilia.

Notable people
 William F. Baker, structural engineer for the Burj Khalifa
 Morris Frederick Bell, architect
 Nick Cave, fabric sculptor, dancer, and performance artist 
 Henry Bellamann, poet and author of Kings Row
 John Ferrugia, journalist
 Tony Galbreath,  running back in the National Football League for the New Orleans Saints 1976–80, the Minnesota Vikings 1981–83, and the New York Giants 1984–87
 William Lincoln Garver, architect, author, and socialist politician
 Charlie James,  Major League Baseball outfielder for the St. Louis Cardinals 1960–65
 John Jameson, politician 
 Michael Kim, ESPN anchor and personality
 Bake McBride, Major League Baseball outfielder and 1974 National League Rookie of the Year
 Ron McBride, running back in the National Football League for the Green Bay Packers 1973
 Laura Redden Searing, also known as Howard Glyndon, deaf poet and writer
 Helen Stephens, 1936 Olympic Champion (The Fulton Flash)

References

Further reading
  Lael, Richard L;. Brazos, Barbara; McMillen, Margot Ford. Evolution of a Missouri Asylum: Fulton State Hospital, 1851-2006 (University of Missouri Press, 2015)

External links

 Historic maps of Fulton in the Sanborn Maps of Missouri Collection at the University of Missouri

Cities in Callaway County, Missouri
Cities in Missouri
County seats in Missouri
Jefferson City metropolitan area
Populated places established in 1825